Carlo Janka (born 15 October 1986) is a Swiss former alpine ski racer. Born in Obersaxen, in the canton of Graubünden, he had the winter sports facilities right in front of his home. Janka has won gold medals at both the Winter Olympics and the World Championships, as well as one World Cup overall title, one discipline title and also, one unofficial alpine combined title.

In 2013, Janka set a World Cup speed record in the downhill part of the super combined event in Wengen, Switzerland.

Ski racing career
Janka competed in his first international FIS race in December 2001 at age 15. Not until four years later did he reach the podium, but success came in all four disciplines. Janka began racing on the Europa Cup circuit in January 2004.  He earned his first two World Cup starts in December 2005 but did not finish either race.  At the Junior World Championships in 2006 at Mt. Ste. Anne, Quebec, Canada, he won the bronze medal in giant slalom, and he finished the 2007 season in fourth place in the overall Europa Cup standings.

Janka scored his first World Cup points in the giant slalom at Alta Badia, Italy, on 17 December 2006, finishing in 20th place. But his World Cup breakthrough began two years later, on 29 November 2008, when he came out of the 65th starting position to finish a surprising second place in the downhill at Lake Louise. Two weeks later, he gained his first World Cup victory in a giant slalom race at Val d'Isère, France, followed the next month by a victory in the Lauberhorn super-combined in Wengen.  A month later, he won the gold medal in giant slalom and the bronze in downhill at the 2009 World Championships in Val d'Isère.

On the weekend of 4–6 December, 2009, Janka achieved a remarkable feat by winning the super-combined, downhill, and giant slalom on the challenging Birds of Prey course at Beaver Creek, Colorado. Janka was the first to win three World Cup races in a single weekend since Hermann Maier at the same location ten years earlier. On the same weekend as Janka triumphed in Beaver Creek, Lindsey Vonn almost duplicated the feat on the women's tour at Lake Louise, winning two races and narrowly missing a third win. On 16 January 2010, Janka won the Lauberhorn downhill in Wengen, the longest and fastest race on the World Cup tour, a day after nearly repeating his 2009 win in the super-combined by narrowly placing second behind Bode Miller.

On 23 February 2010, Janka won the gold medal in the giant slalom at the 2010 Vancouver Olympics at Whistler Creekside in Whistler, British Columbia, Canada.

At the World Cup finals in Garmisch, Germany, in March 2010, he became the fourth Swiss racer to win the World Cup overall title. He clinched the title by winning the downhill and giant slalom, which left his nearest opponent, Benjamin Raich, 106 points back with one race remaining, an insurmountable margin.

In October 2010, Janka was awarded the Skieur d'Or Award by members of the International Association of Ski Journalists for his performances during the previous season, thereby becoming the first Swiss male skier to receive the honor since Pirmin Zurbriggen won it back in 1990.

Following the 2011 World Championships, Janka had some health problems but recovered well and resumed training five days later, winning the giant slalom at Kranjska Gora, Slovenia, on 5 March for his sole victory of the 2011 season.

Janka switched equipment following the 2013–14 season, from Atomic to Rossignol.

World Cup results

Season titles

Unofficial, a crystal globe for AC was not awarded between 2013 and 2015.

Season standings

Race podiums
11 wins – (3 DH, 1 SG, 4 GS, 3 AC) 
28 podiums – (11 DH, 3 SG, 6 GS, 1 PG, 7 AC)

World Championships results

Olympic results

References

External links

Rossignol Skis – Carlo Janka
Swiss Ski team – official site – 
  – 

1986 births
Living people
People from Surselva District
Swiss male alpine skiers
Olympic alpine skiers of Switzerland
Alpine skiers at the 2010 Winter Olympics
Alpine skiers at the 2014 Winter Olympics
Alpine skiers at the 2018 Winter Olympics
Olympic gold medalists for Switzerland
Olympic medalists in alpine skiing
FIS Alpine Ski World Cup champions
Medalists at the 2010 Winter Olympics
Sportspeople from Graubünden
21st-century Swiss people